The England cricket team toured Scotland in 2010. The tour consisted of one One Day International (ODI), played on 19 June 2010.

Only ODI

2010
International cricket competitions in 2010
2010 in English cricket
2010 in Scottish cricket